Destructor may refer to:
 Destructor (computer programming), in object-oriented programming, a method which is automatically invoked when an object is destroyed
 Euronymous (1968–1993), guitarist and co-founder of the Norwegian black metal band Mayhem
 Spanish warship Destructor (1886), a fast ocean-going torpedo gunboat
 Destructor, a Marvel Comics character; see Advanced Idea Mechanics
 Destructor, a Futurama character
 Cherax destructor, the scientific name for the Common Yabby
 a municipal incinerator; the term destructor was used well into the 20th century.